New York State Route 3C may refer to:

New York State Route 3C (1930–1932) in Cayuga, Oswego, and Jefferson Counties
New York State Route 3C (1932–1935) in Monroe County